Egyptischer Marsch (Egyptian March), Op. 335, is a march composed by Johann Strauss II. It was commissioned for the inauguration of the Suez Canal, celebrated on 17 November 1869 in Port Said, where Emperor Franz Joseph I of Austria officiated at the ceremonial opening, though it was first performed on 6 July 1869 in Pavlovsk, Saint Petersburg, under the title "Tscherkenssen-Marsch" (March of the Circassians). Strauss later dedicated the work to Frederick I, Grand Duke of Baden.

In musical terms, Johann Strauss' "Egyptian March" has been described as a "representative example of an" alla turca "composition... characterised by melodic arabesques and metric syncopations".

References

External links

, Vienna Philharmonic, Christian Thielemann (Vienna New Year's Concert )
"Circassian March", score, HathiTrust
"Egyptischer Marsch", score, HathiTrust

Compositions by Johann Strauss II
Music dedicated to nobility or royalty
March music
1869 compositions
Orientalism
Works about Egypt